Sir Richard Eustace Thornton,  KCVO, OBE (10 October 1922 - 7 January 2014) was Lord Lieutenant of Surrey from 2 May 1986 until 29 October 1997. He was educated at Eton College and Trinity College, Cambridge. He was married to Gay and had four daughters.

References

1922 births
2014 deaths
Alumni of Trinity College, Cambridge
Lord-Lieutenants of Surrey
People educated at Eton College